Domain is a shopping centre located next to Yau Tong station in Yau Tong, Kwun Tong District, Kowloon, Hong Kong. The shopping centre is serving about 80,000 people in Yau Tong Estate, Yau Lai Estate, Yau Chui Court, Yau Mei Court and Lei Yue Mun Estate. It is the largest one owned by Hong Kong Housing Authority after most of its shopping centre assets were sold to Link REIT in 2005.

Description
Domain has a total gross floor area of about 45,000 square metres. It has eight floors with total lettable area of 23,000 square metres. The four-level retail space can accommodate some 150 shops of different varieties. It also includes a community hall and a public transport interchange for buses, minibuses and cross-border coaches.

History 
Known in the planning stages as "Shopping Centre at Yau Tong Estate Redevelopment Phase 4", the complex cost about HK$1.5 billion to construct. The construction contract was awarded by the Housing Authority to China State Construction Engineering (HK) in November 2009. The shopping centre opened as "Domain" on 29 September 2012.

See also
 Lei Yue Mun Plaza

References

External links 

 

Shopping centres in Hong Kong
Yau Tong
2012 establishments in Hong Kong
Shopping malls established in 2012